Peter Rubeck (born 28 December 1961) is a German former professional footballer who played as a midfielder.

References

1961 births
Living people
German footballers
1. FC Saarbrücken players
FC 08 Homburg players
SV Eintracht Trier 05 players
Borussia Neunkirchen players
Association football midfielders
2. Bundesliga players
German football managers
FC 08 Homburg managers
Wormatia Worms managers
SV Eintracht Trier 05 managers
FSV Salmrohr managers